Pammene critica, the redgram webber or leaf webber, is a moth of the family Tortricidae. The species was first described by Edward Meyrick in 1905. It is found in India and Sri Lanka.

Biology
The caterpillar is a pale whitish yellow with more yellowish towards its posterior. In the vegetative stage, the caterpillar webs the leaves of the host plant together and feeds inside the web. Apanteles mohandasi is a specific endo-parasitoid on caterpillars.

Larval food plants are Sorghum, Caesalpinia, shoots and seeds of Cajanus cajan and pods of Crotalaria juncea.

Known predators
Apanteles mohandasi
Apanteles sauros
Apanteles taragamae
Temelucha minuta
Elasmus albopictus
Elasmus anticles
Pediobius cydiae
Eurytoma sp.Protapanteles obliquaeGoniozus sp.Pristomerus microdonCopidosomaDolichogenidea molgandasi''

References

External links
https://www.cabdirect.org/cabdirect/abstract/20173068080

Moths of Asia
Moths described in 1905
Thyrididae
Grapholitini